The 2016 season for Team Sky began in January at the Tour Down Under.

As a UCI WorldTeam, they were automatically invited and obliged to send a squad to every event in the UCI World Tour.

Team roster

Season victories

National, Continental and World champions 2016

Footnotes

References

External links
 

2016 in British sport
2016 road cycling season by team
Ineos Grenadiers